Blanchard Hill is a hill located 1.7 miles from the center of Dunstable, Massachusetts.

History

From the years 1959 to 1988, Blanchard Hill was used as the location for a ski resort.  The Blanchard Hill Ski Area initially featured a single ski tow and an open slope, but was later expanded to include three ski tows, three action slopes, a T-bar lift and three slopes as well as a ski lodge.  The area was eventually closed and sold off in 1988, to be divided up into a housing development on Sky Top Lane and a conservation area which includes 39.38 acres of land.

References

Geography of Middlesex County, Massachusetts